Non is a fictional supervillain appearing in American comic books published by DC Comics. He first appeared in the 1978 film Superman: The Movie portrayed by actor and former boxer Jack O'Halloran. The character made his comic book debut in Action Comics #845 (January 2007). An accomplice of General Zod and an adversary of the superhero Superman, he is typically depicted as having been imprisoned in the Phantom Zone, along with Zod and Ursa, among whom he is portrayed as the strong and silent muscle.

In television, the character was portrayed by Chris Vance in the Arrowverse series Supergirl as the antagonist of the first season.

Character biography

Films

First appearing in Superman, Non is incapable of speaking and considered by Jor-El as "a mindless aberration, whose only means of expression are wanton violence and destruction". Non, General Zod, and Ursa are put on trial for mounting a failed coup against the Kryptonian government, found guilty, and sentenced to life imprisonment in the Phantom Zone.

In Superman II, after Superman throws a hydrogen bomb into Earth's orbit, he unknowingly shatters the Phantom Zone, allowing Non, Zod, and Ursa to escape. Upon gaining powers from Earth's yellow sun, they travel to the White House to force the President to submit to them. In the process, they encounter Lex Luthor, who forms an alliance with the trio to help them find Superman in exchange for control of Australia. Following several battles between Superman and Zod's forces, he eventually tricks them into coming to the Fortress of Solitude and bathing it in red light to weaken the trio before sending the criminals to the Fortress' bottomless depths with Lois Lane's help. In a deleted scene, Zod's forces are arrested by human authorities. In Superman II: The Richard Donner Cut, it is revealed that Superman went back in time to make sure that Zod's group remained in the Phantom Zone.

Comics
In October 2006, film director Richard Donner, noted for his work on the first two Superman films, began to write Action Comics in collaboration with Geoff Johns. After an unidentified Kryptonian boy crash lands in Metropolis and is taken in by Lois Lane and Clark Kent, he is followed by three more Kryptonians in identical vessels: General Zod and Ursa (who claim the boy as theirs) as well as Non. In these comics, Non is portrayed as being more bulky than in the Superman II movie, but maintaining the same personality.

It was revealed that Non was a friend to Jor-El, as well as a member of the Kryptonian Council, while they discovered Krypton's instability. After leading a separatist movement, Non was abducted by the Science Council and lobotomized, leading to his current status as a minimally-verbal brute. Although now a highly aggressive and mentally lacking enforcer for Zod, Non has apparently retained a level of his old personality and kindness, when dealing with young children. In another Action Comics Annual, it is explained that after Zod and Ursa give birth to their son (who would later become known as Christopher Kent), Non behaved not only docile but caring towards Chris during his early childhood.

After being re-imprisoned in the Phantom Zone by Superman and Chris, Zod, Ursa, and Non once again returned to the Prison. Unknown to the first two, Chris took secret refuge in the prison, with only Non aware of him. Non continued to behave as a protective caretaker towards Chris, bringing him food and hiding him from his parents. When Chris was at last found and tortured by his parents, another Kryptonian, Thara Ak-Var, arrived to rescue Chris; Non was quick to help them as a final act of his humanity and kindness.

Non is punished for this act and made an aspirant in the Kryptonian military under lieutenant Asha Del-Nar, in a unit designated Red Shard. Superman is placed into the Military Guild, named Commander of the Red Shard unit. Superman finds the other Aspirants are forcing Non to fight a wild animal as a hazing, which he stops. Since this, he has been loyal to Kal-El. When trying to round up some wild thought-beasts, Non sees himself holding a young girl.

Powers and abilities
While on Earth in the Superman II movie, Non had superhuman strength, virtual invulnerability, superhuman speed, flight, marginal heat vision, and super breath. Non stands at 6'6" and is exceptionally muscled, which further augments his superhuman strength to a degree. In recent comics, Richard Donner has portrayed Non's strength as greater than that of General Zod and Ursa put together due to his greater size and muscle mass, possibly outmatching that of Superman and other mature Kryptonians; yet Non is neither as intelligent nor as brutal as the other two and thus cannot exert the full measure of his superhuman strength nor can he improvise its use. The movie version of Non is a birth-defect mute (although his comic-book alter-ego, Kru-El, spoke whole sentences) and appears to also be less intelligent than General Zod and Ursa; as stated by Jor-El, "His only means of expression are wanton violence and destruction."

Additionally, similar to Zod and other Kryptonian Phantom Zone escapees, Non rarely has enough time beneath the yellow sun of Earth to absorb and metabolize enough yellow sunlight to experience the full measure of his abilities as he and the other escapees are typically always defeated and banished back to the Zone before any significant length of time passes. As such, if Non was allowed enough time in the Sun to fully charge his cells with yellow solar energy, he would be significantly more physically powerful and more potent with superhuman strength than any other adult Kryptonian, possibly even Superman.

Like all Kryptonians, he is vulnerable to Kryptonite as well as the light of a red sun; he may be vulnerable to magic and mind control as well due to the raw physical nature of his Kryptonian virtual invulnerability, though this has never been seen. An atomic bomb would also cause significant injury to his body and can prove fatal if unrelenting. Despite his great size and strength, he is still insufficient in a battle against the likes of Doomsday and his superhuman speed is insufficient compared to Speedsters like the Flash. Additionally, his relatively low intelligence and apparent lack of cognitive ability puts him at many disadvantages in a battle, though he can competently follow issued orders. Non's accelerated healing factor may be deficient to a degree, as his muteness did not improve upon entering the empowering and rejuvenating environment of a yellow sun.

In other media

Television
 Non appears in Supergirl, portrayed by Chris Vance. This version is the articulate husband and second-in-command of Astra In-Ze and uncle of Supergirl. Years prior to the series, Non and Astra previously led a separatist movement on Krypton before they were imprisoned in the Phantom Zone via the maximum security prison, Fort Rozz, prior to Krypton's destruction. After Supergirl's pod got lost in the Phantom Zone and crash-landed on Earth, it took Fort Rozz with it, allowing Indigo to instigate a prison break and leading to Astra's forces undergoing a crusade to save Earth from humanity, only to be hunted by the Department of Extranormal Operations (DEO). When Supergirl grows up and joins the DEO to help re-apprehend the escapees, Non pressures Astra to accelerate her plans until she is killed by Alex Danvers. In response, Non takes command of her remaining forces, joins forces with Indigo, and sets out to do Astra's bidding by using Project Myriad, a Kryptonian program that enables mass mind control and negates hopeful thoughts, to destroy the craniums of every human on Earth, only to be foiled by Supergirl and the Martian Manhunter and killed by the former.
 Non appears in the DC Super Hero Girls two-part episode "#DCSuperHeroBoys". This version was imprisoned in the Phantom Zone by Alura Zor-El.
 Non appears in Young Justice: Phantoms.

Video games
 Non, alongside General Zod and Ursa, appears as the collective final boss of Superman.
 Non appears in DC Universe Online.
 Non appears as a support card in the mobile version of Injustice: Gods Among Us.
 Non makes a cameo appearance in Sub-Zero's ending in Injustice 2. Following High Councilor Superman's imprisonment in the Phantom Zone, the Justice League accidentally open a portal that allows him, Non, General Zod, and Ursa to escape while trying to send Sub-Zero back to his home universe.

References

Kryptonians
Comics characters introduced in 2007
DC Comics characters who can move at superhuman speeds
DC Comics characters with accelerated healing
DC Comics characters with superhuman senses
DC Comics characters with superhuman strength
DC Comics extraterrestrial supervillains
DC Comics military personnel
DC Comics supervillains
Fictional characters with absorption or parasitic abilities
Fictional characters with air or wind abilities
Fictional characters with energy-manipulation abilities
Fictional characters with fire or heat abilities
Fictional characters with ice or cold abilities
Fictional characters with nuclear or radiation abilities
Fictional characters with slowed ageing
Fictional characters with superhuman durability or invulnerability
Fictional characters with X-ray vision
Fictional mute characters
Superhero film characters
Superman characters